Joe Birrell (born 11 March 1930) is a British hurdler. He competed in the men's 110 metres hurdles at the 1948 Summer Olympics.

References

External links
 

1930 births
Living people
Athletes (track and field) at the 1948 Summer Olympics
British male hurdlers
Olympic athletes of Great Britain
Place of birth missing (living people)